Ferenc Jánosi (17 June 1938 – 19 February 2023) was a Hungarian volleyball player. He competed in the men's tournament at the 1964 Summer Olympics.

Jánosi died in Budapest on 19 February 2023, at the age of 84.

References

External links

1938 births
2023 deaths
Hungarian men's volleyball players
Olympic volleyball players of Hungary
Volleyball players at the 1964 Summer Olympics
Sportspeople from Miskolc